Due pezzi di pane, internationally released as Happy Hobos, is a 1979 Italian comedy film directed by Sergio Citti.

Cast 

 Vittorio Gassman: Pippo Mifà 
 Philippe Noiret: Peppe Dorè 
 Gigi Proietti: Albergatore 
 Paolo Volponi: Judge 
 Anna Melato: Lucia

References

External links

1979 films
Italian comedy films
1979 comedy films
Films directed by Sergio Citti
1970s Italian films